The 2023 Nigerian presidential election in Oyo State will be held on 25 February 2023 as part of the nationwide 2023 Nigerian presidential election to elect the president and vice president of Nigeria. Other federal elections, including elections to the House of Representatives and the Senate, will also be held on the same date while state elections will be held two weeks afterward on 11 March.

Background
Oyo State is a large, Yoruba-majority southwestern state; the state has vast agricultural and service sectors but it faces large security issues from both inter-ethnic violence and conflict between herders and farmers along with a large number of out-of-school children.

Politically, the 2019 elections in the state were categorized as a large swing towards the PDP as the party's presidential nominee Atiku Abubakar narrowly won the state after Buhari had won it in 2015, PDP nominee Seyi Makinde won the gubernatorial race by 17%, and the PDP gained a majority in the House of Assembly. For the Senate, the APC won back two Senate seats it lost through defections while the PDP gained a APC-held seat; in the House of Representatives, the APC won the majority of the seats.

Polling

Projections

General election

Results

By senatorial district 
The results of the election by senatorial district.

By federal constituency
The results of the election by federal constituency.

By local government area 
The results of the election by local government area.

See also 
 2023 Oyo State elections
 2023 Nigerian presidential election

Notes

References 

Oyo State gubernatorial election
2023 Oyo State elections
Oyo